The Mystical Beast of Rebellion is the 3rd studio album by black metal band Blut Aus Nord. An expanded double-LP version with new material was released in December 2010; a 2-CD version with the new material followed shortly thereafter.

Track listing

Disc one
"The Fall: Chapter I" – 6:39
"The Fall: Chapter II" – 7:43
"The Fall: Chapter III" – 3:38
"The Fall: Chapter IV" – 6:50
"The Fall: Chapter V" – 6:01
"The Fall: Chapter VI" – 10:22

Disc two (2010 edition only)
"The Fall: Chapter 7.7" – 8:20
"The Fall: Chapter 7.77" – 9:30
"The Fall: Chapter 7.777" – 19:21

Personnel
Blut Aus Nord
Vindsval - vocals, electric guitar
Nahaim - bass guitar
W.D. Feld - keyboards, drums, percussion

Blut Aus Nord albums
2001 albums